This is a list of the top selling singles and top selling albums in Ireland in 2004.

Top selling singles 
 "Toxic"- Britney Spears 
 "F**k It (I Don't Want You Back)" - Eamon 
 "The Langer" - Tim O'Riordan and Natural Gas 
 "Milkshake" - Kelis 
 "Left Outside Alone" - Anastacia 
 "Everytime" - Britney Spears 
 "Do They Know It's Christmas?" - Band-Aid
 "Yeah!" - Usher feat Lil' Jon and Ludacris 
 "Dragostea Din Tei" - O-Zone 
 "Call on Me" - Eric Prydz

Top sellings albums 
 How to Dismantle an Atomic Bomb - U2
 Living - Paddy Casey
 Greatest Hits - Guns N' Roses 
 Songs about Jane - Maroon 5 
 Final Straw - Snow Patrol 
 O - Damien Rice 
 Greatest Hits - Robbie Williams 
 Greatest Hits: My Prerogative - Britney Spears 
 Confessions - Usher
 A Grand Don't Come for Free - The Streets

See also 
List of songs that reached number one on the Irish Singles Chart
List of artists who reached number one in Ireland

Resources 
IRMA Official Site

External links 
IRMA Official Site
Top40-Charts - Ireland Top 20

2004 in Irish music
Ireland best selling
2004